In theoretical physics, the hypothetical particle called the graviscalar or radion emerges as an excitation of general relativity's metric tensor, i.e. gravitational field, but is indistinguishable from a scalar in four dimensions, as shown in Kaluza–Klein theory. The scalar field  comes from a component of the metric tensor  where the figure 5 labels an additional fifth dimension.  The only variations in the scalar field represent variations in the size of the extra dimension.  Also, in models with multiple extra dimensions, there exist several such particles.  Moreover, in theories with extended supersymmetry, a graviscalar is usually a superpartner of the graviton that behaves as a particle with spin 0.  This concept closely relates to the gauged Higgs models.

See also
 Graviphoton (aka gravivector)
 Dilaton
 Kaluza–Klein theory
 Randall–Sundrum models
 Goldberger–Wise mechanism

References
 Roy Maartens, “Brane-World Gravity”, Living Rev. Relativ., 7, (2004), 7. , 

Supersymmetry
Theories of gravity
Hypothetical elementary particles
Force carriers